Ahmad Mahfuz Umar (Arabic: أحمد محفوظ عمر ; born in Aden in 1936) is a Yemeni writer. He is considered to be one of the pioneering figures of modern Yemeni literature and was a co-founder of the Yemeni Writers' Union. At an early age, he won a short story competition organised by the journal Al-Nahdah with his story Murdi'at al-atfal (1956). His stories often deal with life in the big city and similar gritty themes. He has published several collections of short fiction, including Al-indhar al-mumazzaq (1960),  Al-agras al-samita (1974), Ya ahl hadha al-jabal (1978) and Al-nab al-azraq (1980).

Umar's work has been translated into Italian and was included in a 2009 anthology of Yemeni literature called Perle dello Yemen.

References

External links
 Lengthy profile in Arabic in Yemenitta.com

Yemeni writers
People from Aden
1936 births
Living people